The 2011 FIBA Africa Women's Clubs Champions Cup (17th edition) was an international basketball tournament  that took place at the Indoor Sports Hall of the National Stadium in Surulele, Lagos, Nigeria, from December 5 to 11, 2011. The tournament, organized by FIBA Africa, and hosted by First Deepwater, was contested by 5 clubs in a round robin system followed by a third-place match played by the 3rd and 4th placed teams from the preliminary round and a final played by the two top teams from the same round.
 
The tournament was won by Interclube from Angola, thus retaining its title. It was Interclube's 2nd title and Angola's 3rd.

Participating teams

Squads

Qualification

Preliminary round

Times given below are in UTC+1.

Final round

Bronze medal game

Final

Final standings

All Tournament Team

See also
 2011 FIBA Africa Championship for Women

References

External links 
 2011 FIBA Africa Champions Cup for Women Official Website
  Afrobasket.com
 FIBA Africa official website

2011 FIBA Africa Women's Clubs Champions Cup
2011 FIBA Africa Women's Clubs Champions Cup
2011 FIBA Africa Women's Clubs Champions Cup
21st century in Lagos
FIBA